The thangals (also spelled tangals) are a social group among the Muslims of Kerala, south India. The thangals are often regarded as roughly equivalent to the more general Sayyids or Sharifs, or the descendants of the Islamic prophet Muhammad, of the wider Islamic culture. Most members of the community practices endogamy and rarely marry outside from their community.

The thangal families are numerous in Kerala, all receive recognition, but some are considered as saints. The thangal identification brings much 'reverence and attention' in the Kerala Muslim community (which predominantly identifies with Shafi'i madhab). Some individuals take advice from the thangals on crucial matters. A number of thangals in Kerala 'treat' people for illness and to 'ward off evils'.

Thangal families have many gradations of status on social and economic scale. Influential of the thangals generally come from prominent business families. They usually exercise their influence through commerce and politics.

Major thangal families in north Kerala 
	

 Tharamal family (Mambram)
 Sayyid Jifri Thangal (mid-1700s)
 Hassan Jifri Thangal (mid-1700s)
 Syed Alavi Thangal (1749 - 1843)
 Syed Fazl Thangal

 Pukkoya family (Panakkad-Kodappanakkal House)
 Sayyid Ali Thangal
 Sayyid Husain ibn Muhlar (1812-1882)
 P. M. S. A. Pukkoya Thangal (d. 1975)
Muhammedali Shihab Thangal (1936 - 2009)
Hyderali Shihab Thangal (born 1947)

 Velluvangad Thangal family
Syed Muhammed Imbichi Koya Thangal Al Buhari

 Kondotty Thangal family
 Muhammad Shah Thangal

 Bafaki Thangal family (Calicut)
Syed Bafaqy Thangal (d. 1973)

Notes 

 1.Only some scholars consider the thangals as a 'community' among the Muslims of Kerala.

References

Further reading

External links 
 
 

Muslim communities of Kerala
Islamic terminology
Islamic honorifics
Muslim communities of India
Social groups of Kerala
Islam in Kerala